CC cream is a marketing term coined in the wake of the marketing term Blemish Balm cream or Beauty Balm.   "CC cream" is used by some brands to mean Color Control cream, or Color Correcting cream, and some brands claim to reduce the appearance of skin redness or sallowness or to improve uneven skin tone. BB creams and CC creams are both tinted moisturizers containing sun protection. There is no scientific definition for either term, nor is there quantifiable basis for difference between BB creams and CC creams: differences between the two vary from brand to brand. BB (Blemish Balm) cream was originally formulated in Germany and has, in recent years, gained popularity in Asia, especially South Korea, and is also gaining popularity in Europe and North America.

Coverage can vary greatly among the different brands, and differences are more often than not minimal when compared to BB creams. Some users apply them as primers rather than as a replacement for foundation. Most cosmetics companies offer both BB- and CC-creams without any particular market leader in 2016.

See also 
 DD cream

References 

Skin care
History of cosmetics
Cosmetics